Saša Avramović (born January 16, 1993) is a Serbian professional basketball player who currently plays for Iskra Svit.

References

External links
 FIBA.com Profile

1993 births
Living people
ABA League players
BK Iskra Svit players
KK Mega Basket players
KK Mladost Čačak players
Serbian men's basketball players
Serbian expatriate basketball people in North Macedonia
Serbian expatriate basketball people in Slovakia
Basketball players at the 2010 Summer Youth Olympics
Serbian men's 3x3 basketball players
Point guards
Youth Olympic gold medalists for Serbia
Slávia TU Košice players